In enzymology, a phycocyanobilin:ferredoxin oxidoreductase (PcyA) is an enzyme that catalyzes the chemical reaction

(3Z)-phycocyanobilin + oxidized ferredoxin  biliverdin IXalpha + reduced ferredoxin

Thus, the two substrates of this enzyme are (3Z)-phycocyanobilin and oxidized ferredoxin, whereas its two products are biliverdin IXalpha and reduced ferredoxin.

This enzyme belongs to the family of oxidoreductases, specifically those acting on the CH-CH group of donor with an iron-sulfur protein as acceptor.  The systematic name of this enzyme class is (3Z)-phycocyanobilin:ferredoxin oxidoreductase. This enzyme participates in porphyrin and chlorophyll metabolism.

Structural studies

References

 
 
 

EC 1.3.7
Enzymes of known structure